John Ross House may refer to:

John Ross House (Rossville, Georgia), listed on the NRHP in Georgia
John Ross House (Branson, Missouri), listed on the NRHP in Taney County, Missouri
John Ross House (Durban, South Africa), a skyscraper

See also
Ross House (disambiguation)
John Ross (disambiguation)